Enez Mudeizi Mango (born 1 July 1996) is a Kenyan professional  footballer who plays as a left wing back for Romania liga 2 feminine  club  FC Farul Constanta , (association football)|]], and the Kenya women's national team.

International career 
Mango made her debut for the team in a 2022 African Cup of Nations qualifiers against South Sudan.

See also
List of Kenya women's international footballers

References

External links 
 
 

1993 births
Living people
Footballers from Nairobi
Kenyan women's footballers
Women's association football fullbacks
Kenya women's international footballers